The Power and the Glory was a 13-part television documentary series shown between 4 October and 27 December 1991 on BBC2. The series covers 100 years of motor racing history.

The series was released on VHS in 1992 in the UK as a set of two tapes. It was released in the US by Columbia House as a set of thirteen tapes. The title of the book Power Without Glory, subtitled Racing the Big-Twin Cooper, which was published in 2015, was a play on the title of the original tv series and book, and the notion of motor racing being 'glorious'.  The title alludes to the 1948 and onwards Cooper twin's enormous power-to weight ratio, with which the little car was expected to challenge the then dominant front-engined racing cars of France and Italy.

Episode list

References

External links

The Power and the Glory at the VideoCollector.co.uk
Loose Fillings Sydney

1991 British television series debuts
1991 British television series endings
1990s British documentary television series
Automotive television series
BBC television documentaries
Documentary television series about technology
English-language television shows